Alloleptis is a genus of snipe fly of the family Rhagionidae. It is a small fly of about 4 mm and only known from Sulawesi. It currently contains only one species, Alloleptis tersus.

References

Rhagionidae
Diptera of Asia
Monotypic Brachycera genera